Following are the results of the 2008-09 Owen Cup, the Staffordshire, England Rugby Union Cup played at Senior Level.

Knockout stage

  
Preliminary round

Rugeley    15   10   Whittington

References

Owen Cup
Owen Cup
Owen